Henry's Hamburgers is a former American fast-food restaurant chain of the 1950s, 1960s, and 1970s. Only one franchise store, in Michigan, remains.

History
In 1954 the Bresler's Ice Cream Company decided to expand into the growing fast-food drive-in industry. Company executives were looking for a new outlet to promote higher sales of their malts and shakes without altering their existing ice cream shop franchises. Under the name Henry's Hamburgers, many franchises were eventually established. The name Henry was chosen to honor the memory of the late Henry Bresler, one of the brothers who had founded the ice cream company.
Henry's was modelled after James Collin's Hamburger Handout restaurants in Southern California which in turn had been modelled after the McDonald brother's San Bernardino operation. They were both a Chicago area competitor and copy of McDonald's.

Growth
By 1956, Henry's Hamburgers had thirty-five locations in the Chicago area. At the time that outnumbered some of the industry's current giants, such as McDonald's. By the early 1960s there were over two hundred Henry's restaurants across America with operations headquarters in Chicago.  Henry's used the advertising slogans "Aren't you hungry for a Henry's?" and "Head for Henry's", and offered burgers for as low as 15 cents or "ten burgers for a buck".

Decline
By the mid-1970s Henry's Hamburger locations began closing while repeated mergers and ownership changes took place within the Bresler company. The only remaining location is in Benton Harbor, Michigan.

See also
 List of defunct fast-food restaurant chains
 List of hamburger restaurants

References

External links
 Henry's TV Commercial

Defunct restaurant chains in the United States
Fast-food franchises
Fast-food chains of the United States
Defunct fast-food chains in the United States
1954 establishments in Illinois
Restaurants established in 1954
Restaurants in Chicago
Benton Harbor, Michigan
Restaurants in Michigan